Felix Olorunfemi (born 8 June 1966) is the Anglican Bishop of Etsako in Bendel Province  of the Church of Nigeria.

He was consecrated as the second Bishop of Etsako in Lokoja in March 2020.

He had previously been Archdeacon of the Agbor-Obi Archdeaconry in Ika diocese.

Olorunfemi was born on 8 June 1966 in Okpella, Etsako, Edo State, where he went to primary school and then Ikpomaza Grammar School and our Lady of Fatima College, Auchi.

He is a graduate of Bendel State University and of Ezekiel College of Theology, Ekpoma, with a Diploma in Theology in 2005.

Olorunfemi taught English at Mary and Martha Juniorate Convent, Igbodo, from 2002 to 2007 under the then Principal, Godfrey Ifeanyichukwu Ekpenisi.

References 

Anglican bishops of Etsako
21st-century Anglican bishops in Nigeria
Nigerian Anglicans
Anglican archdeacons in Nigeria
People from Edo State
Ambrose Alli University alumni
Nigerian educators
1966 births
Living people